Cornelius Johannes "Corrie" Sanders (7 January 1966 – 23 September 2012) was a South African professional boxer who competed from 1989 to 2008. He won the WBO heavyweight title in 2003 after knocking out Wladimir Klitschko in two rounds, which was considered one of the biggest upsets in heavyweight boxing history; The Ring magazine named it the Upset of the Year. In 2004, having vacated the WBO title, Sanders faced Wladimir's brother Vitali Klitschko in an unsuccessful challenge for the vacant WBC and Ring heavyweight titles. He also held the WBU heavyweight title from 1997 until 2000 and the South Africa national heavyweight title in 1991.

Nicknamed "The Sniper", Sanders was a southpaw with a long reach, and was known for carrying formidable knockout power in his straight left hand. He died in a hospital in the early hours of 23 September 2012 after being shot during an armed robbery.

Early life and amateur career
Sanders grew up in Brits, South Africa. He had two siblings and was of Afrikaner descent. In his youth, he played rugby, cricket, and golf. Having been introduced to boxing by his uncle, Sanders finished his amateur career in the late 1980s with 180 wins and 11 losses. He won the amateur South African heavyweight title four times from 1985-1988.

Professional career
Sanders made his professional debut in 1989 with a first-round knockout of King Kong Dyubele on 2 April 1989. He went on to win his next 22 bouts, 14 by knockout. Among the fighters he defeated during that streak were Steve Zouski, Art Card, future WBO cruiserweight champion Johnny Nelson, and future world title challenger Bert Cooper. In his 24th bout, on 21 May 1994, Sanders suffered his first defeat, to Nate Tubbs via a second-round knockout.

He fought 12 more times over the next five years, including a first-round knockout over former world cruiserweight champion Carlos De León and a second-round knockout over another former world champion, Bobby Czyz. He lost by seventh-round stoppage in a slugfest fight with future unified and two-time world heavyweight champion Hasim Rahman. Sanders and Rahman both knocked each other down during the bout, and Sanders was ahead on the judges' scorecards prior to the stoppage. Rahman said of Sanders following their match: "I've never been hit that hard in my life." Returning to the ring in 2001, he scored a quick win over Michael Sprott and then followed this up with a defeat of Otis Tisdale in 2002. Corrie Sanders' biggest weapons were his southpaw fast hands that he used to knock fighters out early.

WBO heavyweight champion
Despite fighting three rounds in the last two years, the WBO sanctioned a challenge to their heavyweight champion Wladimir Klitschko. Sanders had accepted the bout on short notice and was a 40-1 underdog. On 8 March 2003, Sanders provided a stunning upset in Hanover, Germany, by dropping Klitschko four times to win the WBO belt by a second-round knockout. The Ring magazine named it the Upset of the Year for 2003. Klitschko later called Sanders the hardest puncher he ever faced in a December 2014 interview with The Ring, saying: "I’ve been in boxing for 25 years and I never fought anybody in this game that punched like Corrie Sanders."

WBC heavyweight title challenge
Sanders had initially sought a unification bout with WBA heavyweight champion Roy Jones Jr., who had also won his title in March 2003, and then with heavyweight contender David Tua. When those negotiations fell through, he was scheduled to defend the WBO title against Lamon Brewster on 18 October 2003. However, due to a conflict between WBO and Sanders's promoter, the bout did not take place. Sanders then vacated the WBO title to signed a contract to fight for the vacant WBC belt. The fight took place on 24 April 2004, against Wladimir's older brother, Vitali. Sanders was stopped by Vitali in the eighth round of the fight in the Staples Center in Los Angeles. After Sanders death, Vitali went on to pay his respects to Sanders and called this the hardest fight of his career.

Eight months later, Sanders knocked out Alexei Varakin in the second round of a contest in Soelden, Austria in December 2004. He briefly retired after that bout.

Sanders returned to action after two years in November 2006 to score a second round stoppage win over the Australian heavyweight champion Colin Wilson at the Convention Centre in Mafikeng. He had signed with Golden Gloves Promotions, and won another bout in South Africa against Brazilian Daniel Bispo in May 2007. His last bout, of the South African heavyweight title, was a loss to Osborne Machimana, a bout he took despite Sanders being injured beforehand. Sanders' final record was 42 wins (31 by knockout) and 4 losses.

Personal life
Corrie Sanders and his wife Suzette had a son and a daughter.

Death
On 22 September 2012, Sanders was fatally shot in an armed robbery at a restaurant called Thatch Haven in Brits, South Africa, where a function was being held for his nephew's 21st birthday. He had been near the entrance of the restaurant talking to his 15-year-old daughter Marinique and a cousin when three robbers entered firing their guns. Sanders had used his body to shield his 15-year-old daughter from oncoming bullets and then, while bleeding from bullet wounds in his right arm and stomach, pulled her to the ground and whispered for her to pretend to be dead. Sanders was taken to a hospital in Pretoria, where he died in the early hours of 23 September 2012 of his wounds.

On 27 September 2012, following a tip-off, North West police arrested three men in Oukasie near Brits, charging them with the murder of Sanders. All three were citizens of Zimbabwe. At one address, two suspects were apprehended and police recovered a cellular phone, a vehicle key, a purse and cash stolen during the robbery. Police then went to a second address, arrested a third suspect, and recovered a handbag also stolen in the robbery. The trial was postponed until August 2013 as investigators attempted to use a fourth suspect, now serving a 30-year sentence in Zimbabwe for killing a police officer, to locate the gun used in the crime.

On 11 February 2015 at a High Court in Pretoria, Judge Ferdi Preller sentenced Paida Fish, Chris Moyo and Samuel Mabena each to 43 years' imprisonment, of which they have to serve 30, on charges of murder, robbery with aggravating circumstances, and the unlawful possession of firearms and ammunition.

Professional boxing record

References

External links

Corrie Sanders obituary at The Daily Telegraph

1966 births
2012 deaths
Sportspeople from Pretoria
Heavyweight boxers
South African male boxers
World Boxing Organization champions
World heavyweight boxing champions
Male murder victims
South African murder victims
People murdered in South Africa
Deaths by firearm in South Africa
White South African people
South African people of Afrikaner descent
People from Brits, North West
Sportspeople from North West (South African province)